The Kodak Digital Camera System is a series of digital single-lens reflex cameras and digital camera backs that were released by Kodak in the 1990s and 2000s, and discontinued in 2005. They are all based on existing 35mm film SLRs from Nikon, Canon and Sigma. The range includes the original Kodak DCS, the first commercially available digital SLR.

History

In 1975 Kodak engineer Steven Sasson invented the first digital still camera, which uses a Fairchild  100 x 100 pixel CCD. By 1986 Kodak had developed a sensor with 1.4 million pixels.

A number of other inventions were made to increase usability, including improvements in sensor technology, the first raw image format DCR, and usable host software. The original Kodak DCS was launched in 1991, and is based on a stock Nikon F3 SLR with digital components. It uses a 1.3-megapixel Kodak KAF-1300 sensor, and a separate shoulder-mounted processing and storage unit. The DCS 200 series of 1992 condenses the storage unit into a module which mounted onto the base and back of a stock Nikon F-801s SLR. The module contains a built-in 80 megabyte hard drive and is powered with AA batteries. It was followed by the upgraded DCS 400 series of 1994, which replaces the hard drive with a PCMCIA card slot. The DCS 400 series includes the 1.5-megapixel DCS 420, and the 6-megapixel Kodak DCS 460, which retailed for $28,000 on launch. In common with Kodak's later 6-megapixel models, the DCS 460 used the award-winning APS-H Kodak M6 sensor. A modified version of the DCS 420 was also sold by the Associated Press as the Associated Press NC2000. In parallel with the DCS 400 series Kodak also sold the analogous Kodak EOS DCS range, which was based on the Canon EOS-1N SLR. With the exception of the original DCS 100, these early models do not include LCD preview screens.

Kodak's subsequent models integrate the digital module with the camera body more thoroughly, and include LCD preview screens and removable batteries. The DCS 500 series of 1998 is also based on the Canon EOS-1N, and comprises the 2-megapixel DCS 520 and the 6-megapixel DCS 560, which initially had a suggested retail price of $28,500. These models were also sold by Canon, as the Canon D2000 and D6000 respectively, and were the first digital SLRs sold under the Canon name. Kodak used the same electronics package for the DCS 600 series, which is based on the Nikon F5. The DCS 600 range includes the Kodak DCS 620x, a high-sensitivity model with an upgraded indium tin oxide sensor and a cyan-magenta-yellow Bayer filter, which has a then-unique top ISO setting of ISO 6400.

Kodak concluded the initial DCS range with the DCS 700 series, which comprises the 2-megapixel DCS 720x, the 6-megapixel DCS 760, and the 6-megapixel DCS 760m, which has a monochrome sensor. By the time of launch, Kodak faced competition from the popular Nikon D1 and Nikon D1x, which were physically smaller and cheaper. The DCS 760's initial list price was $8,000.

Kodak final generation of DCS cameras was launched with the Kodak DCS Pro 14n, a 14-megapixel full-frame digital SLR, in 2002, and continued with the upgraded DCS PRO SLR/n in 2004. These two cameras are based on a Nikon F80 body, and are considerably more compact than previous Kodaks. They use sensors designed by Belgian imaging company FillFactory. The DCS PRO SLR/n was also accompanied by the Canon-compatible DCS PRO SLR/c, which is based on a Sigma SA9 SLR. Kodak discontinued the SLR/n and SLR/c in May 2005, to concentrate on compact digital cameras and high-end medium format digital backs for Leaf, among others.

Kodak continued to design and manufacture digital imaging sensors, including the full-frame 18-megapixel KAF-18500, which is used in the Leica M9 digital rangefinder, until its digital sensor division was sold to Platinum Equity in 2012. This digital sensor company now operates under the name Trusense.

Models

35mm Nikon based

All models based on Nikon body and use Nikon's F mount.
Kodak DCS - May 1991, later called DCS 100, first commercially available DSLR camera, Nikon F3 based body. Many variants.
Kodak DCS 200 - 1993, Nikon F-801s (N8008s) based body. Color, monochrome and infrared variants.
Kodak NC2000 series - August 1994, Nikon F90/N90 and N90s based body, designed in speed and noise characteristics for press use.
Kodak DCS 400 series - August 1994, Nikon F90/N90 and Nikon F90s/N90s based body
Kodak DCS 600 series - 1999, Nikon F5 based body
Kodak DCS 700 series - 2001, Nikon F5 based body
Kodak DCS Pro 14n - 2002, Nikon F80 based body, full-frame. Kodak DCS Pro 14nx variant incorporates updated sensor, memory buffer and firmware from DCS Pro SLR/n.
Kodak DCS Pro SLR/n - 2004, Nikon F80 based body, full-frame.

APS Nikon based
Kodak DCS 300 series - 1998 and 1999, budget priced professional Nikon APS format SLR Pronea 600i and Pronea 6i based body, uses Nikon's F mount and additionally special Nikkor IX (APS) lenses

35mm Canon based
All models use Canon's EF lens mount.
Kodak EOS DCS series - 1995, Canon EOS-1n based body. Rebranded by Canon as EOS DCS 1, -3 and -5.
Kodak DCS 500 series - 1998, Canon EOS-1n based body. Rebranded by Canon as Canon EOS D2000 and Canon EOS D6000
Kodak DCS Pro SLR/c - 2004, Sigma SA9, with Canon EF compatible mount and electronics.

Medium format camera backs
Kodak DCS Pro 645 -  1995, 6-megapixel digital camera back for several medium format cameras like Hasselblad 500 / 503, Mamiya RB / RZ and Sinar cameras
Kodak DCS Pro Back / Plus / 645 - 2000, 16-megapixel digital camera back for several medium format cameras.

References

External links
The DCS Story: 17 years of Kodak Professional digital camera systems Nikonweb
KODAK PROFESSIONAL DCS Digital Cameras Kodak
Kodak DCS cameras based on Nikon 
Nikon Digital Still SLR camera models Mir
DCS-1, 3, 5 Series with Canon EOS 1n body chassis Mir
DCS-500 Series with Canon EOS-1n body Chassis Mir
The Kodak DCS420, DCS460, EOS DCS5 and Nikon E2s digital cameras on test Epi-centre
Electronic Photo Imaging EPIcentre Library of Reports and Reviews
Kodak DSLR Camera-wiki.org

DCS
Digital camera backs